The Red Skull is an alias used by several supervillains appearing in American comic books published by Marvel Comics and its predecessor Timely Comics. The first version, George Maxon, appeared in Captain America Comics #1 and #3. The main incarnation of the character, Johann Shmidt, was created by Joe Simon and Jack Kirby, and first appeared in Captain America Comics #7 in October 1941. A third Red Skull, Albert Malik, battled Spider-Man in stories related to the death of his parents. Originally portrayed as a Nazi agent and protégé of Adolf Hitler during World War II, the Red Skull has endured as the archenemy of the superhero Captain America. Initially wearing a fearsome blood-red death skull mask that symbolizes carnage and chaos to intimidate, decades after the war he suffers a horrific disfigurement that matches his persona.

The character has been adapted to a variety of other media platforms, including animated television series, video games and live-action feature films.

He was portrayed by actor Scott Paulin in the 1990 direct-to-video film Captain America. In the Marvel Cinematic Universe, Hugo Weaving portrayed the character in Captain America: The First Avenger (2011), and was then replaced by Ross Marquand in Avengers: Infinity War (2018) and Avengers: Endgame (2019), who also voiced an alternate version of the character in the Disney+ animated series What If...? (2021).

Publication history
The original Red Skull was introduced in Timely Comics' Captain America Comics #1 (cover-dated March 1941) which was written and drawn by the team of Joe Simon and Jack Kirby. On separate occasions, both Kirby and Simon claimed to have had the original idea for the character, and at the 1970 San Diego Comic Con, Kirby said the Red Skull was created by France Herron. Simon later credited both Kirby and Herron with having a role in creating Red Skull.

The Skull was to appear again in issue #3 of Captain America Comics. As in issue #1, the Red Skull's secret identity is George Maxon, the owner of the Maxon Aircraft Company that makes airplanes for the US Army. Maxon wears a mask to create the look of the Red Skull and his face is often exposed. As the Red Skull, Maxon commandeers bank robberies in an effort to raise money to overthrow the US government, declaring, "Of course you realize the main item in overthrowing the government is money!"

Stories published decades later established that the Red Skull appearing in Captain America #7 (October 1941) was the Nazi Johann Shmidt, and that the Red Skull appearing before that point was his pawn George Maxon.  The Red Skull also appeared in Young Allies #1 and #4.  He appeared maskless in both issues, including when getting up from bed in issue #1 and while in a fighter jet with one other ally in #4.

After an absence from comics for many years, both Captain America and the Red Skull were brought back in 1954 in Young Men Comics #24, in a story entitled "Back From The Dead". Here the Red Skull, thinking Captain America was dead, has left politics and started a big criminal enterprise in the United States. In his next appearance, in issue #27, the Red Skull is once again left for dead.

The character returned in new stories starting with Tales of Suspense #65 (May 1965) in a Captain America World War II-period story run. Red Skull was established as a contemporary villain in issue #79 (July 1966), with the explanation that he had been in suspended animation since World War II.

For decades, the character's true face was hidden, but in Captain America #297 (September 1984) the Red Skull unmasks in front of Captain America and his face, albeit extremely aged, is fully revealed. In the next issue, the Red Skull retells his story with his face fully visible in his various ages. When the character is revealed to be alive in issue #350 (February 1989), in a story called "Resurrection", by Mark Gruenwald, the face of Johann Shmidt's original body is hidden again, but the Red Skull's face is fully visible, albeit in his cloned copy of Captain America's body.

The character's origin was more fully illustrated in the miniseries Red Skull: Incarnate, with Shmidt's face fully visible again.

Fictional character biography

Johann Shmidt
Johann Shmidt was a Nazi general officer and confidant of Adolf Hitler. He has been closely affiliated with HYDRA and is an enemy of S.H.I.E.L.D., the Avengers, and the interests of the United States and the free world in general. He was physically augmented by having his mind placed into the body of a clone of Captain America, the pinnacle of human perfection. He has been seemingly killed in the past, only to return time and time again to plague the world with schemes of world domination and genocide.

World War II era
Johann Shmidt was born in a village in Germany to Hermann Shmidt and Martha Shmidt. His mother died in childbirth, and his father blamed Johann for her death. Johann's father tried to drown the baby, only to be stopped by the attending doctor; he later committed suicide, leaving Johann an orphan. The doctor took Johann to an orphanage, where the child led a lonely existence. Johann ran away from the orphanage when he was 7 years old and lived on the streets as a beggar and thief. As he grew older, he worked at various menial jobs but spent most of his time in prison for crimes ranging from vagrancy to theft. The Skull's real name of Johann Shmidt was not revealed in his Golden Age and Silver Age appearances.

As a young man, Shmidt was from time to time employed by a Jewish shopkeeper, whose daughter Esther was the only person who had treated Shmidt kindly up to that point. Seized with passion for Esther, Schmidt tried to force himself upon her, only for her to reject him. In unthinking fury, Schmidt murdered her. Shmidt fled the scene in terror but also felt ecstatic joy in committing his first murder. In killing Esther, he had given vent to the rage at the world that had been building up in him throughout his young life.

According to the official version of the story told by the Red Skull and the Nazis, Shmidt met Hitler while working as a bellhop in a hotel. This occurred during his late teens, around the same time that the Nazi Party gained power in Germany. Shmidt wound up serving Hitler's rooms at the hotel. By chance, Shmidt was present by bringing refreshments when the Führer was furiously scolding an officer for letting a spy escape, during which Hitler declared that he could create a better National Socialist out of the bellhop. Looking closely at the youth and sensing his dark inner nature, Hitler decided to act on his words and recruited Shmidt. In the miniseries Red Skull: Incarnate, it has been revealed that Shmidt actually engineered his meeting with the Führer with himself disguised as a bellhop, tricking his fellow orphan Dieter into trying to kill Hitler and then taking this opportunity to save Hitler's life.

Dissatisfied with the standard drill instruction his subordinates used to train Shmidt, Hitler took over personally, training Shmidt as his right-hand man after Heinrich Himmler. Upon completion, Hitler gave Shmidt a unique uniform with a grotesque red skull mask, and he emerged as the Red Skull (in literal German: Roter Totenkopf or Roter (Toten-)Schädel) for the first time. His role was the embodiment of Nazi intimidation, while Hitler could remain the popular leader of Germany. To that end, the Red Skull was appointed head of Nazi terrorist activities with an additional large role in external espionage and sabotage. He succeeded, wreaking havoc throughout Europe in the early stages of World War II. The propaganda effect was so great that the United States government decided to counter it by creating their own equivalent using the one recipient of the lost Project Rebirth: Steve Rogers, as the superhero/counterintelligence agent, Captain America.

In Europe during the war, the Red Skull took personal command of many military actions and personally supervised the takeovers and lootings of many cities and towns. The Red Skull also organized a Wolf Pack of U-Boats which preyed upon shipping across the world, often under the Red Skull's personal command. At first, Hitler took great pride in his protégé's successes and let the Red Skull have anything he wanted. Hitler thus financed the construction of secret bases for the Red Skull in various locations throughout the world, many of which were equipped with highly advanced experimental weapons and devices developed by Nazi scientists. The Red Skull was particularly interested in procuring technological weapons that could be used for the purposes of subversion and warfare. During the war he stole plans for the nullatron, a device that could control human minds, adapted a space-warping device developed by the cyborg scientist code-named Brain Drain, and commissioned Nazi scientists to develop a projector which could encircle and suspend sections of cities within spheres of energy.

But while the Red Skull always admired Hitler for his ideological vision, he was never fully content with being Hitler's subordinate. The Red Skull kidnapped and killed many of Hitler's closest advisers and eventually rose to become the second-most-powerful man in Nazi Germany. Now Hitler could no longer effectively control the Red Skull and came to fear him, especially since the Red Skull had made no secret of his ambition to supplant Hitler someday.

Captain America, often with teenage partner Bucky Barnes, fought and thwarted the Red Skull many times during the war. The heroes also fought the Red Skull when they were members of the Invaders. On one occasion the Red Skull captured, drugged, and brainwashed Captain America. He sent the hero to kill a high-ranking officer, but with Bucky's help Captain America broke free. The Red Skull later temporarily brainwashed three of the Invaders into serving him. The Red Skull and Captain America continued to engage in a series of skirmishes throughout the war.

After the renowned military officer Baron Wolfgang von Strucker had a falling-out with Hitler, the Red Skull sent Strucker to Japan to found an organization that would prepare the way for takeovers in the Far East under the Red Skull's leadership. In the Far East, Strucker joined a subversive organization that came to be known as HYDRA, severed his ties with the Red Skull, became head of HYDRA and made it into a major threat to world peace.

As World War II raged on, Hitler vowed that if he could not conquer the world, he would destroy it. To achieve this end, the Red Skull proposed the construction of five gigantic war machines, to be called the Sleepers, which would be hidden in various locations while they generated and stored the power they would need, and then be released at a future date, "Der Tag" ("The Day" in German), to destroy the Earth if the Allies won the war. Hitler enthusiastically instructed the Red Skull to construct the Sleepers, unaware that the Red Skull intended to use them to conquer the world himself if Nazi Germany fell. In the closing days of the war in Europe, Allied intelligence received reports of a Nazi doomsday plan, code-named "Der Tag", to be implemented after Hitler's defeat. However, the Allies had no idea what the plan entailed.

The Red Skull sent a number of his subordinates who became known as the Exiles, and a large contingent of loyal German soldiers and their wives to a secret island base ("Exile Island"), where they would organize an army for use in the future.

Now that the German defeat was becoming a reality, the Red Skull was more determined than ever to obtain vengeance for his numerous personal defeats by Captain America and Bucky. The Red Skull assigned Baron Heinrich Zemo to go to England, and, under the cover of stealing an experimental Allied drone plane, to capture or kill Captain America and Bucky. However, the Red Skull was unaware that the Allies had just secretly parachuted Captain America into beleaguered Berlin to investigate "Der Tag".

Finally, Captain America tracked the Red Skull down to his hidden bunker. The Red Skull was about to hurl an armed hand grenade at his nemesis when Captain America threw his shield at him. The grenade exploded, but the Red Skull was not killed, due to his body armor. He was, however, seriously hurt and partially buried in debris. Thinking he was dying, the Red Skull defiantly told Captain America that the Sleepers would avenge the Nazis' defeat. Then, suddenly, an Allied attack on Berlin began. An Allied plane dropped a huge blockbuster bomb on the bunker, causing a cave-in that Captain America barely escaped. Captain America was picked up by the Allies and returned to England only to fall into Zemo's trap, which led to Bucky's supposed death and Captain America's falling into suspended animation for decades. Support pillars that crisscrossed over the Red Skull when the bunker caved in saved him from being struck by tons of rubble when the bomb hit. The cave-in also released an experimental gas from canisters in the bunker which put the Red Skull into suspended animation, during which time his wounds slowly healed.

Post-World War II era

Modern era

Johann Shmidt's legacy continued to cause trouble by way of the Sleepers which are activated by his agents as scheduled. Captain America neutralizes all the machines in turn.

Johann Shmidt is eventually rescued and revived from suspended animation in modern times by the terrorist organization A.I.M. The Red Skull quickly subverts a cell to his own ambitions of world conquest and the death of Captain America. He steals the Cosmic Cube after taking control of its Keeper's mind with a device he planted while shaking hands, and reveals that he ordered Baron Zemo to steal the bomb plane that led to Bucky Barnes's death. He had a rivalry with Zemo, and hoped to set his two foes against each other. Captain America learns, from the dying pilot of a plane that had been following the Keeper's plane, that the Cosmic Cube had been used to destroy the plane. Shmidt tells another A.I.M. member of his plans after getting a mind control device on him, then causes him to shoot himself. He fights Captain America again for the first time in years after getting the Cosmic Cube on an island. He begins sending Captain America to another dimension when Captain America offers to become his servant. The Red Skull encases himself in a golden suit of armor, and talks of creating a new order of knights. Captain America gets close to him while the Red Skull prepares to knight him. Captain America tries to get the Cosmic Cube, and in the fight the island splits apart from the Cosmic Cube's power, and the Red Skull falls off a cliff while trying to get the Cosmic Cube. When Johann reappears, he and Albert Malik start to antagonize each other while both claiming the Red Skull identity. Finally Malik is the victim of an assassination organized by the Red Skull, through a rogue agent of the Scourges of the Underworld.

The Red Skull captures part of Manhattan Island, unleashes the fourth Sleeper, and captures Captain America on Exile Island. The Red Skull then regains the Cosmic Cube and temporarily switches bodies with Captain America. He also uses the Cube to alter the personality of Sam "Snap" Wilson. Some time later in his first appearance outside of a title featuring Captain America, he fights Doctor Doom. The Red Skull then foments racial hatred in New York, and is revealed as the true power behind a Las Vegas-based HYDRA fragment, and clashes with Kingpin.

Some time later, the Red Skull kills Roscoe (another wearer of the Captain America mantle). He also revives the use of his "dust of death". The Red Skull later fights Doctor Doom on the moon, but is defeated. With Arnim Zola, the Red Skull seeks to transplant Hitler's brain into Captain America's body. He transforms a number of S.H.I.E.L.D. agents into his red skull-faced slaves. The Red Skull teams with the Hate-Monger (a clone of Hitler) and traps him in a flawed Cosmic Cube. The Red Skull leads the Nihilist Order for a brief time. Establishing a Nazi colony on a deserted island, the Red Skull fathers a daughter: Synthia Schmidt.

The gas that placed the Red Skull in suspended animation wears off and his body rapidly ages to his actual years. Now physically weak and feeble in his mid-80s, the Red Skull plans a final showdown with his archrival. Kidnapping Captain America's closest allies, he forces Captain America to surrender himself to a medical treatment that ages his body to its rightful age. The two men, their bodies now ancient, fight a battle to the death. When Captain America refuses to kill him, the Red Skull dies in Captain America's arms, cursing his enemy as his elderly body shuts down.

Resurrection
Nazi geneticist Arnim Zola had obtained DNA samples of Captain America years earlier and arranged for the Red Skull's mind to be transplanted into a cloned body of Captain America at the moment of his death. Assuming the identity of "John Smith" (the English equivalent of his natural German name), the Red Skull decides to reinvent himself and his quest for absolute power as a means to celebrate his cheating death. The Red Skull abandons his longstanding beliefs in National Socialism and Hitler, on the belief that the Nazi philosophy made him look like a relic of the past, and turns towards American ideology. The Red Skull sees much potential in the American dream of capitalism and self-determination and sets about establishing his own foothold inside Washington, D.C., culminating in him gaining control over the Commission on Superhuman Activities, a government body in Washington that monitors and regulates superhero activities.

The Red Skull also changes his mode of operations: rather than "living from one grand scheme to the next", he begins financing a score of evil organizations that report directly to him, such as the militia group the Watchdogs. He also employs one of the Scourges of the Underworld, an organization dedicated to killing supervillains.

The Red Skull has the Commission remove Steve Rogers from the position of Captain America and replace him with jingoist John Walker. Although Walker attempts to live up to his predecessor's ideals, the Red Skull arranges for the murders of Walker's parents, driving him insane and into a downward spiral of murder as part of his plan to blacken the name of Captain America.

The Red Skull kills his chief pawn in the Commission right in front of Captain America. About to be exposed, the Red Skull tries to manipulate Walker into killing Rogers. When Rogers defeats Walker, the Red Skull appears to gloat at what he had done to Rogers, Walker, and the reputation of Captain America. However, Rogers remains openly dubious of his claims to be his dead archenemy. The Red Skull tries to kill Rogers with a cigarette holding a lethal dose of the dust of death (the Red Skull's favorite poison), but Walker hits him from behind with his shield. The Red Skull inhales the dust of death and his face takes on the appearance of a living red skull; his head loses its hair and its skin shrivels, clinging tightly to his skull, and taking on a red discoloration. The Red Skull survives the exposure due to the effects of the Super-Soldier Formula.

After this, the Red Skull masterminds a conflict between the United States and Symkaria. He joins the "Acts of Vengeance" conspiracy, but is attacked by the mutant terrorist Magneto, a Holocaust survivor who wants to punish him for his involvement in Hitler's regime. Magneto buries him alive with enough water to last a few months. The Red Skull remains imprisoned, close to death and beginning to see the error of his ways, until he is rescued by his henchman Crossbones. Feeling ready to die in peace, the Red Skull requests to be taken to his private estate's bed, and for Captain America to come see him. Upon seeing his archenemy's face, the Red Skull is surprised to feel a sudden burst of hatred that reignites his will to live.

The Red Skull proposes an alliance with the Kingpin to bring a new designer drug to New York, but the Kingpin refuses to ally with the Nazi and the two engage in a drug war. He then defeats the Red Skull in hand-to-hand combat, sparing his life on the condition that he never come near the Kingpin's territory again. After the Red Skull's agents allow fellow Nazi Baron Wolfgang von Strucker to be reborn, the grateful Strucker allows the Red Skull the use of HYDRA resources.

The Red Skull's tenure in Washington comes to an end when he is captured by Hauptmann Deutschland, and taken to Germany to stand trial for crimes against humanity, stemming from his days as a Nazi agent. The Red Skull narrowly escapes and is rescued by Arnim Zola, and forced to fake his death and go into hiding in a Rocky Mountain compound. He recruits the Viper, a move that alienates his minions and is further rocked when his chief henchman Crossbones kidnaps Captain America's girlfriend Diamondback, resulting in Captain America finding the Red Skull's new lair. The Red Skull fires Crossbones and goes into hiding while the Viper, using funds she plied from the Red Skull as part of a scheme to use televisions across America to blind TV viewers, is defeated by Captain America.

The Red Skull discovers that he is facing the same permanent paralysis that Captain America was facing due to their exposure to the Super-Soldier Formula. When the evil scientist Superia offers Captain America a cure, Captain America refuses it because Superia said that Captain America would owe her. The Red Skull takes the cure and apparently kills Superia, then arranges for Captain America to be kidnapped by his remaining forces (including Sharon Carter, whom he found still alive and recruits), and given a blood transfusion that cures him.

Captain America's recovery segues into a reluctant team-up with the Red Skull; a Nazi cult that worshiped Hitler as a god had discovered a Cosmic Cube that contained Hitler's soul, put there by the Red Skull himself. The two try to stop the cult from fully powering the Hitler Cosmic Cube, but the Red Skull opts instead to send Captain America (against his will) into the cube to kill Hitler, imprisoning Captain America in the cube while he uses its power to conquer humanity. Captain America escapes and uses his shield to sever one of the Red Skull's arms, causing him to drop the Cube. The Cube becomes unstable, destroying the Red Skull.

Trapped in a hellish nightmare dimension and forced to serve as a bellhop to a world of non-European immigrants, the Red Skull's will ultimately is so great that he is able to escape his prison. As a result, the Red Skull now possesses limited reality-warping powers that make him a cosmic threat. He is further aided by Korvac, posing as Kang the Conqueror. He is sent to Galactus's ship to steal more power (particularly the power of omniscience), which would remove all limits to the Red Skull's reality-warping powers. The Red Skull is ambushed by Korvac, who steals his cosmic powers and banishes him back to Earth.

The Red Skull later manipulates his way into the position in the form of US Secretary of Defense Dell Rusk (an anagram of "Red Skull") to develop a biological weapon called "Project Bloodwash" he tested at Mount Rushmore. He is exposed and defeated by the Avengers, where the Black Panther beats him so badly that he breaks the Red Skull's jaw in half.

Possessing Aleksander Lukin

The Red Skull was assassinated by the mysterious Winter Soldier, under orders from the renegade former Soviet general Aleksander Lukin wanting to possess the new Cosmic Cube the Red Skull had manufactured. When the Red Skull was shot, he attempted to use the Cosmic Cube to switch bodies with Lukin to survive, but as the Cosmic Cube was still weak he only managed to transfer his mind into Lukin's body, so that the two enemies are trapped together, waging a constant war for dominance which the Red Skull seems to be progressively winning. During a plot to lure out Captain America, the Red Skull/Lukin recruited several German skinheads and made them the successors to Master Man. He then had these soldiers, dubbed the "Master Race", launch an attack on London, which was thwarted by Captain America, Spitfire and Union Jack. Then, the Red Skull/Lukin activated a Sleeper, a robot programmed for mass destruction that was presumably created by Doctor Doom. The robot damaged a significant portion of the new London Kronas H.Q., and was ultimately destroyed by Captain America and Bucky. In the aftermath, the Red Skull sent a videotape, announcing to the world his return, followed by Lukin holding a press conference condemning the actions of both the Red Skull and Captain America, and supporting the Superhero Registration Act. Then, in his office, the Red Skull introduced Lukin to his old/new associates Crossbones and Sin.

With America's superheroes divided over the act, the Red Skull manipulates events to his own ends, with the aid of Doctor Faustus, Doctor Doom and Arnim Zola. His plans involved the reunion of Captain America and his former lover Sharon Carter being manipulated by Faustus.

In the immediate aftermath of the Civil War, the Red Skull puts his plans into action, arranging for Crossbones to shoot Captain America as he enters a courthouse in New York City; in the ensuing chaos, Carter, acting under Faustus's mental directive, assassinates Captain America. This is only the first phase of the Red Skull's plan. Upon the discovery of his identity as Lukin, the Red Skull fakes his death, and initiates the second phase of his plan: using the Kronas Corporation's vast holdings to economically cripple the United States, before having S.H.I.E.L.D. agents brainwashed by Doctor Faustus open fire on crowds of protesters in front of the White House. The Red Skull continues his assault by engineering a riot by placing Kronas security troops and drugged water in a protest on the Lincoln Monument.

All of this has apparently been to elevate his puppet politician, Gordon Wright, elevated in the public's eye with being credited as "resolving" the situations, as well as surviving a (staged) attack by the Serpent Squad. Once elected, Wright will lead the country directly into a police state secretly controlled by the Red Skull. The Red Skull also plans to transfer his consciousness into Sharon's unborn child, apparently sired by Steve Rogers himself and potentially having inherited his Project: Rebirth enhancements.

Both schemes fail because of the impatience and incompetence of the Red Skull's daughter—her near-fatal attack on Sharon causes her to lose the baby, and she intentionally botches her pseudo-assassination of Wright by attempting to kill him for real. As Faustus has surreptitiously tampered with Sharon's programming, she is able to rebel, and before escaping shoots Lukin to death. This is not the end of the Red Skull, since Zola had seconds earlier transferred his mind to one of the spare robotic bodies, but after having his current form damaged by the impostor Captain America, he is unable to return to the Red Skull, essentially trapping him in his current robotic form for the time being.

Captain America: Reborn
It has been revealed that the Red Skull did not actually kill Steve Rogers, but trapped his body in a fixed position in space and time. He was planning on using Sharon Carter and a machine created by Doctor Doom to return his body back to their time, but since Sharon destroyed the machine, his body is now drifting through time and space. Apparently, it is presumed that the Red Skull intended to transfer his mind into Rogers' body. Norman Osborn decides to assist in completing his plan, as a figurehead of Captain America leading his team of Avengers would increase popularity with as the Iron Patriot. Sin and Crossbones find him and take him to Latveria to place the Red Skull's mind in a living body. The Red Skull, Sin and Crossbones land in Latveria and Doctor Doom confronts them, saying that he would kill them if he was not a man of his word. Doctor Doom and Zola complete the machine and, after Victoria Hand brings Sharon to them, they strap her in. They activate the machine and soon Steve's body returns. When Steve opens his eyes, they are shown to be red, signifying that the Red Skull is now in control. Rogers still resides in the body and during the Red Skull's invasion of Washington, D.C., he and Steve battle in the mind of Steve's body. Steve eventually forces the Red Skull out, placing him back into his robot body. To prevent him from escaping the immediate area, Sharon hits the Red Skull with a shot of Pym particles, making him a massive robot who cannot elude any pursuer's attention. While Rogers and the Avengers keep the Red Skull occupied with a team attack, he is destroyed by a missile barrage fired by Sharon on a hijacked A.I.M. battleship.

Return
After Lukin was brought back from the dead by the Power Elite, a side effect has a fragment of the original Red Skull's mind also revived.

Other identity users
There had been other people who passed themselves off as the Red Skull:

George John Maxon

Created by Joe Simon and Jack Kirby, George John Maxon appeared as Red Skull in Captain America Comics #1 and #3 (March–May 1941). He faces Captain America during two of the latter's early missions. Maxon is an American businessman and Nazi agent who leads a ring of spies and saboteurs and serves as a stand-in of Johann Schmidt (the true Red Skull). Maxon is thought killed during the second encounter, though he would reappear for one last encounter with Captain America.

Albert Malik
After the disappearance of Johann Schmidt in 1945, the reputation of the Red Skull was still formidable enough to prove useful. In 1953, Soviet Russian KGB agent Albert Malik set up his spy/criminal organization in Algeria and assumed the Red Skull identity, pretending that he was the original, when he was actually serving Soviet interests, in Captain America Comics #61. During the 1950s, he faced the then-active version of Captain America, who was also pretending to be the original. While the Captain and Bucky (Jack Monroe) were placed into suspended animation when his flawed replicate of the Super-Soldier Formula seriously affected his and Bucky's minds, Malik continued his activities, and over time severed his links to the Soviet Union.

He was also responsible for the deaths of Richard Parker and Mary Fitzpatrick-Parker, the parents of Peter Parker, tipped off by the supercriminal Gustav "the Gentleman" Fiers to their spy status.

Malik was later killed by a Scourge of the Underworld, operating on behalf of the original Red Skull (Johann Schmidt) disguised as a pilot.

Sinthea Shmidt

Sinthea "Sin" Shmidt is the daughter of Johann Shmidt who briefly adopts the Red Skull moniker after being scarred like her father.

Clone of Johann Shmidt
Following the Avengers vs. X-Men storyline, the Red Skull mysteriously returns and assembles a team called the S-Men. The Red Skull's S-Men attack Rogue and the Scarlet Witch at Professor X's grave and steal the mutant's body. In his hideout, the Red Skull is then seen removing Professor X's brain in a plot to "eradicate the mutant menace". This Red Skull is revealed to be a clone of the original created by Arnim Zola in 1942 and held in cryogenic stasis in the event that Germany lost the war. Fusing part of Professor X's brain with his own, the Red Skull brainwashes the Scarlet Witch as part of a plot to wipe out the world's mutant population. Rogue attacks the Scarlet Witch and they fight until they both discover the lobotomized body of Professor X. The Red Skull arrives and reveals that he has fused his brain with Professor X's brain. Using Professor X's telepathy, the Red Skull provokes ordinary citizens of New York into a mass assault against even potential mutants, even managing to take control of Thor. However, his telepathy is still erratic, with the Red Skull being unable to completely control Captain America and an attack against him by Wolverine cutting off his right hand and disrupting his powers long enough for Rogue and the Scarlet Witch to break free. The team ultimately force the Red Skull to retreat after Rogue manages to temporarily disrupt his powers, Havok mockingly comparing the Red Skull to the jock who beats up gay kids to conceal his own homosexuality.

During the AXIS storyline, Magneto finds out that the Red Skull has turned Genosha into a concentration camp for mutants and still has Professor X's brain inside him. Magneto attacks the Red Skull, but is quickly stopped by the S-Men. The Red Skull mind-tortures Magneto with visions of those closest to the mutant suffering while being unable to do anything to stop it. After being freed by the Scarlet Witch, Rogue and Havok, he bites down on a vial beneath his skin of Mutant Growth Hormone, giving himself enough power to fight. When the Scarlet Witch, Rogue and Havok want to leave the island and alert the rest of the Avengers and the X-Men of what the Red Skull is doing, Magneto wants to stay and fight. Before they can do anything, the Red Skull appears. The Red Skull now has the group mind-controlled. He plans on using the Scarlet Witch's power to shape reality in his image. He tells Magneto to bow if the Scarlet Witch were to remain alive, but Magneto performs a sneak attack enough to break the Red Skull's control over the others. After killing the S-Men, Magneto attacks the Red Skull, who then tells Magneto that Professor X's greatest fear was leading the X-Men. Magneto kills the Red Skull while the others look on in horror. Magneto believes everything is over, only for the Red Skull to appear as a giant called "Red Onslaught".

In an attempt to defeat the new Red Onslaught and his army of Stark Sentinels—created from information acquired from Tony Stark during the time of the Superhuman Registration Act—Magneto gathers a team of villains to try to take the Red Skull's forces by surprise. The Scarlet Witch attempts to cast a spell that will 'invert' the Red Skull and bring out the part of Professor X that still exists in his brain. However, the plan backfires when the resulting spell causes the moral inversion of all heroes and villains in the area. With the villains now the only hope to defeat the corrupted heroes, Captain America is forced to protect the Red Skull (now calling himself the White Skull) from the evil Avengers while Spider-Man works with the inverted villains to fight off the various corrupted heroes. Doctor Doom is able to summon the spirit of Brother Voodoo to possess the Scarlet Witch and invert the spell, the Red Skull sacrificing his heroism and freedom to restore the heroes to normal. The Red Skull was later taken away by Doctor Doom.

As part of the All-New, All-Different Marvel, it is revealed that the Red Skull is hiding in Avengers Mansion (now a themed hotel as the various Avengers teams have moved on to new bases) in a secret underground room along with Sin (whose original appearance has been restored) ever since he was defeated. He is nearly discovered when Quicksilver and Deadpool investigate the room, but uses a psychic suggestion to convince them that the room is empty, as well as planting a command in Quicksilver's subconscious that will be triggered later.

During the Avengers: Standoff! storyline, the Red Skull infiltrates the S.H.I.E.L.D. facility Pleasant Hill by disguising himself as a priest named Father Patrick. As Patrick, the Red Skull secretly instigates an uprising of the facility's brainwashed inmates by manipulating Baron Helmut Zemo and the Fixer into restoring them to normal. In the aftermath of the battle with the villains at Pleasant Hill, the Red Skull founds his own version of HYDRA with Sin and Crossbones. Their first strike occurs when they use Kobik—a sentient Cosmic Cube that once belonged to the Red Skull, now 'educated' to perceive HYDRA as a great organization—to manipulate Steve Rogers's memories into believing of being a HYDRA sleeper agent since childhood, although the Red Skull is unaware that the HYDRA-converted soldier now intends to stage a coup of the organization for his own ends.

The Red Skull eventually mounts an assault on the Avengers, using previously planted commands to take control of the team, but Deadpool is able to resist him long enough to place Magneto's old helmet on Rogue's head, rendering Rogue immune to telepathy long enough to knock the Red Skull out and take him to be operated on by the Beast. The fragment of Professor X's brain is extracted from the Red Skull, but although Rogers attempts to take custody of the fragment for his own ends, Rogue and Johnny Storm fly up and incinerate the brain fragment, leaving the Red Skull to be taken into 'custody' by Rogers. Although he is rescued by Sin, Sin and Crossbones subsequently betray the Red Skull to prove loyalty to Rogers, who kills the clone for good by pushing him over the cliff outside the Red Skull's mansion with Rogers revealing never being loyal to the Red Skull from the beginning.

During the Secret Empire storyline, the disheveled man in a torn World War II uniform that introduced himself as Steve Rogers, alongside people claiming to be "Bucky" and "Sam Wilson", encounters the Red Skull's clone who plans to taken them "home". As the other Steve Rogers is hanging from a rope tied to a tree, he finds himself next to a rambling man. As the Red Skull's clone takes the rambling man away, he tells the other Steve Rogers that his time will come soon. The other Steve Rogers asks the Red Skull's clone where he is and the Red Skull's clone claims that they are in "Hell". He also states that they are nothing but ghosts that are remnants fading into death. The Red Skull's clone then uses a barbed bat on the other Steve Rogers' chest, stating that the only path to peace is death. The Red Skull's clone is torturing the other Steve Rogers with a burning, thorn-wrapped piece of wood. The Red Skull's clone claims he is granting the other Steve Rogers "peace" and is about to deliver the killing blow to the other Steve Rogers. Before he can strike, the other Steve Rogers sees the beautiful blond girl he saw at the beginning of the series who was the same one that was poisoned and that he thought had died. He realizes there is still hope and evades the Red Skull's clone's attack. The other Steve Rogers then tackles the Red Skull's clone and they both plummet off the cliff into the water below. The Red Skull's clone calls the other Steve Rogers an idiot for his actions.

Powers and abilities
Although he has no superhuman abilities, the Red Skull possesses a high intellect and inventive genius and is a highly gifted subversive strategist and political operative. At one point, the Red Skull's mind inhabited a body cloned from Captain America's, which possessed the mutagenic alterations induced by the Super-Soldier Formula. He was thus endowed with a body that was in perfect physical condition, with strength, speed, durability, agility, dexterity, reflexes, coordination, balance and physical endurance that exceeded that of an Olympic athlete. Despite the scar tissue covering his face and head, his senses were still above-average. He has been shown as a superb martial artist, though he was never on par with Captain America himself; he was originally trained by German athletes appointed by Hitler. He is heavily trained as a skilled marksman with various forms of handguns and well-versed in the use of firearms and explosives.

While sharing Alexander Lukin's body, he lost his superhuman abilities. Since then, he resides in one of the android bodies engineered by Arnim Zola, with enhanced endurance and resilience.

He typically armed himself with a trick cigarette that could fire a fatal poison gas—his trademark "dust of death"—toward his victim. The "dust of death" is a red powder which kills a victim within seconds of skin contact. The powder causes the skin of the victim's head to shrivel, tighten and take on a red discoloration, while causing all of his hair to fall out; hence the victim's head resembles a "red skull". He also carries a large arsenal of conventional and advanced firearms and explosives.

After fusing his own brain with that of Charles Xavier, the clone of the Red Skull gains powerful telepathic abilities. After being killed in a fight with Magneto, the Red Skull clone temporarily evolved into a psionic entity similar to Onslaught, vastly increasing his original powers while also giving him new ones, ranging from material astral projection, total control over his psionic state producing tendrils, changing size and such, energy projection in the form of optic blasts, on top of greatly enhanced control over his psychic abilities being able to effect minds the world over to initiate worldwide hate. After reverting to his original form, however, he later expressed frustration with this new power as it makes conquest too easy for him, realizing that he wants people to grovel before him of their own free will, rather than just making people mindlessly submit. The Red Skull eventually loses these abilities when he is captured by Rogue and taken to Beast, who performs surgery on the Red Skull to extract the elements of Xavier's brain from his own.

Reception

Accolades 

 In 2006, Wizard ranked the Red Skull 21st in their "Top 100 Greatest Villains Ever" list.
 In 2013, Complex ranked the Red Skull 16th in their "25 Greatest Comic Book Villains of All Time" list.
 In 2014, IGN ranked the Red Skull 14th in their "Top 100 Comic Book Vilains" list.
 In 2022, Newsarama ranked the Red Skull third in their "Best Marvel supervillains" list.
 In 2022, CBR.com ranked the Red Skull second in their "13 Most Important Marvel Villains" list and sixth in their "10 Most Charismatic Marvel Supervillains" list.

Other versions

Earth X
Sometime prior to the events of the limited series Earth X, the Red Skull killed Bernie Rosenthal and hailed Captain America as the realization of the Nazi dream. However, Captain America killed the Red Skull, who is later seen in the Land of the Dead and  Mar-Vell's Paradise, waiting to live in his own personal version of Heaven.

Despite his death, the Red Skull's legacy lived on in this universe. The son of Comet Man, Ben Beckley took on the identity of the Skull and set out to conquer the world. Using his ability to control people's cerebrums, he gathers an army of thousands, only to come into conflict with Captain America. The Skull spares him, calling him obsolete, and takes several of Captain America's allies as part of his army. After reaching New York City, the Skull is opposed by Captain America and other heroes, with Captain America killing the Skull to stop him. In the Land of the Dead, the Skull encounters Comet Man and goes on to help the heroes convince the dead that they are deceased.

Amalgam Comics
During the crossover DC vs. Marvel, resulting of Amalgam Comics universe, Lex Luthor's history merged with that of the Skull, creating the Green Skull.

Elseworlds
In the 1997 DC/Marvel Elseworlds special Batman and Captain America, the Red Skull hires the Joker to steal an atomic bomb during World War II. The Joker evades Batman, Captain America, Bucky Barnes, and Robin and delivers it to the Red Skull, but is horrified to learn that the Red Skull is a Nazi as he sees himself as an "American criminal lunatic!" When the Red Skull threatens to drop the bomb on Washington, D.C., the Joker fights him until Captain America and Batman take control of the plane. When they bring it over the ocean, the villains are dropped out with the bomb just before it explodes.

Earth-110
On Earth-110, depicted in the miniseries Fantastic Four: Big Town, the Red Skull allies himself with Doctor Doom, the Hulk, Magneto, Namor, and Ultron to take over Manhattan.

Heroes Reborn (1996)
In an alternate reality depicted in the 1996 Heroes Reborn miniseries, the Red Skull is the banker of Master Man's World Party who is stopped by Nick Fury, Captain America, and the Falcon.

Heroes Reborn (2021)
In an alternate reality depicted in the 2021 "Heroes Reborn" miniseries, the Red Skull became possessed by a Symbiote that originally possessed Nighthawk and re-dubbed himself the Black Skull. Additionally, the Black Skull is the leader of Hydra and a member of the Masters of Doom.

Black Skull later appears as a member of the Multiversal Masters of Evil. He accompanies Ghost Goblin in attacking Captain America and Captain Marvel. Both of them retreat when Star Brand matures and repels them.

It was shown that the Multiversal Masters of Evil had taken over some Earths with Black Skull ruling over Earth-818 and having once used this Earth's Tony Stark to build his War Machines. In his land is a walled city where there is order while everything else is a wasteland. When his forces captured Robbie Reyes and the Deathlok with him, Black Skull tortured Robbie before imprisoning him. Black Skull later spoke to Ghost Goblin about Robbie Reyes as Ghost Goblin mentions that he had never seen a Ghost Rider ride a car before as well as the fact that the Ghost Rider that Black Skull is torturing is not Johnny Blaze or Danny Ketch. Ant-Man later freed Robbie and his Deathlok companion from Black Skull's clutches and took them to meet his fellow rebels Vision, Moon Knight (Mariama Spector), Wonder Man, and Infinity Thing. Before his defeat, Black Skull proceeded to summon other alternate unnamed versions of himself (consisting of a different Red Skull with a similar Venom symbiote, a Red Skull in a Captain America-like suit, a Red Skull possessed by a Carnage symbiote, and a Red Skull/Holocaust hybrid) from different portals to help him against Robbie and the resistance. The variants of Red Skull work to claim Earth-818 for themselves. Robbie, his Deathlok companion, and the resistance receive aid from King Thor's granddaughters. The alternate Red Skulls are defeated and sent back to their Earths as Robbie has them carry a message to the Multiversal Masters of Evil that vengeance is coming. Robbie has Black Skull's symbiote imprisoned in the Hell Charger's trunk while having Black Skull chained up in the heart of the wasteland he created while trapped in a forever penance.

Through unknown means, Black Skull was freed from his imprisonment and given another symbiote. He was present with the Multiversal Masters of Evil when they take over another Earth and plan to return to Earth-616. Just then, Ghost Rider shows up where he uses his control of the Symbiotes to subdue Black Skull and King Killmonger. After Deathlok sacrifices his life to buy Ant-Man of Earth-818 time to get Ghost Rider away, Black Skull was present when Doom Supreme states that they should regroup and head to where they escaped to commit one more slaughter before returning to Earth-616.

Black Skull was with the Multiversal Master of Evil when they arrived on Earth-616 during prehistoric times. During the fight between the Multiversal Masters of Evil and both Avengers teams, Kid Thanos fights Echo and Prehistoric Iron Fist. 9 days later, Black Skull is defeated by Captain America who used his shield to send some fire towards Black Skull. This caused his symbiote to go towards Kid Thanos. Mephisto is told by Kid Thanos on what happened to Black Skull. He states to Kid Thanos that Black Skull is not dead yet.

JLA/Avengers
In the limited series JLA/Avengers, the Red Skull appears as one of the defenders of Krona's stronghold, only to be defeated by Jay Garrick.

Marvel Zombies
In the limited series Marvel Zombies, the Red Skull is an undead zombie with an unquenchable hunger for the flesh of the living. In issue #5, he kills Colonel America, but is decapitated by a zombified Spider-Man and his head crushed by Giant-Man.

Old Man Logan
In Old Man Logan's possible future, wherein Earth's villains defeated Earth's heroes in a final battle, the Red Skull is revealed to be the mastermind of the villains' conquest and made himself President of the United States. Living in a Nazi-redecorated White House, the Red Skull had taken to wearing Captain America's old bloodstained uniform and collecting gruesome trophies from fallen heroes. When his men bring in a wounded Wolverine, Logan and the Red Skull fight. Unwilling to unsheathe his claws during the fight, Wolverine decapitates the Red Skull with Captain America's shield, ending his rule.

Ultimate Marvel

The Ultimate Marvel equivalent of the Red Skull appears as the unnamed illegitimate son of Steve Rogers / Captain America and Gail Richards who wears simple khaki pants and a white tee shirt instead of the Nazi/military costume of his 616 counterpart. After his father's presumed death during World War II, he is taken from his mother and raised in an army base where he appears to be a well-adjusted, physically superior, and tactically brilliant young man who greatly resembles his father. However, his easygoing personality is a ruse. Around the age of 17, he kills over 200 men on the base and cuts off his own face in rejection of his father, leaving behind a "red skull". As a final symbol of his rebellion against the system that created him, he assassinates President John F. Kennedy.

During his career, Skull forces Petra Laskov to choose between killing her husband or infant son. After Petra kills the former, the Red Skull kills the latter anyway and has his henchmen rape Petra. After decades of working as a professional assassin, the Red Skull joins A.I.M. so he and his men can steal the Cosmic Cube's blueprints. While on this quest, he encounters Captain America and beats him. Before throwing Captain America out of a helicopter, the Red Skull reveals his true identity. At A.I.M.'s Alaskan headquarters, the Red Skull kills the lead officer and takes charge of the operation. Now in control of the Cosmic Cube, he gains great power. As a sadistic display of his power, he has the entire Alaskan A.I.M. team cannibalize each other. When the Avengers arrive and attack, the Cosmic Cube imbues the Red Skull with nearly unlimited power, making him invulnerable. Captain America arrives later in a teleporting jet, but the Red Skull forces the jet to crash. Captain America survives the crash and teleports the jet to the Red Skull's exact coordinates, impaling him on one of the nosecone's rods.

The Red Skull is taken to a hospital and kept alive long enough for his mother to say goodbye. The Red Skull explains to Nick Fury that all he wanted to do with the Cosmic Cube was to turn back time and prevent his father from being lost so that he could grow up with him and lead a normal life. The Red Skull is later killed by a disguised Petra.

In other media

Television

 The Johann Schmidt incarnation of the Red Skull appears in the "Captain America" segment of The Marvel Super Heroes, voiced by Paul Kligman.
 The Johann Schmidt incarnation of the Red Skull appears in Spider-Man (1981), voiced by Peter Cullen.
 The Johann Schmidt incarnation of the Red Skull appears in the Spider-Man and His Amazing Friends episode "Quest of the Red Skull", voiced again by Peter Cullen.
 The Johann Schmidt incarnation of the Red Skull appears in a flashback in the X-Men: The Animated Series episode "Old Soldiers", voiced by Cedric Smith.
 The Johann Schmidt incarnation of the Red Skull appears in Spider-Man: The Animated Series, initially voiced by David Warner and subsequently by Earl Boen. This version manipulated John "The Cat" Hardesky in a failed attempt at recreating Captain America's super-soldier serum before getting trapped in suspended animation with the latter in the 1940s. In the present, the Red Skull is freed twice, the first time by his son Rheinholt Schmidt and the second by the Beyonder, only to be re-trapped by Spider-Man and Doctor Doom respectively.
 The Johann Schmidt incarnation of the Red Skull appears in The Super Hero Squad Show, voiced by Mark Hamill. This version was frozen in a block of ice before he is thawed out by Doctor Doom to help the Lethal Legion.
 The Johann Schmidt incarnation of the Red Skull and his Dell Rusk alias appear in The Avengers: Earth's Mightiest Heroes, voiced by Steve Blum. During World War II, the Red Skull uses HYDRA's resources to abduct and take control of Nordic mythological beasts. While Captain America and Bucky Barnes thwart him, the Red Skull indirectly causes the former's suspended animation and the latter's demise while making his escape. In the present, he quietly returns as Dell Rusk, the Secretary of Defense and the leader of Code Red, consisting of the Falcon, Doc Samson, the Red Hulk, and the Winter Soldier. He releases a biological weapon in New York and frames the Avengers for it, sending Code Red to apprehend them. Winter Soldier captures Captain America and presents him to the Red Skull, but Captain America is able to defeat his old enemy and publicly expose him. The Red Skull is remanded to the Avengers' Hydro Base until his Sleepers break him out. He combines the Sleepers into a giant robot to attack Washington D.C. before Captain America and the Winter Soldier work together to defeat the Red Skull and destroy his Sleepers.
 The Johann Schmidt incarnation of the Red Skull appears in Avengers Assemble, voiced by Liam O'Brien. In the first season, he captures Captain America in an attempt to switch bodies with the latter to grant himself a longer life. Though the Avengers reverse the process, the Red Skull steals Iron Man's armor and arc reactor and rechristens himself the Iron Skull before going on to form and lead the Cabal against the Avengers. The Iron Skull later attempts to eliminate his allies until Iron Man reveals his intentions and turns the Cabal against him. Using the power of the Tesseract, the Iron Skull becomes the Cosmic Skull to destroy the Cabal and the Avengers, only to be defeated by both groups and separated from the Tesseract and his armor; returning him to his original Red Skull form. Despite this, he escapes with the Tesseract and attempts to form an alliance with Thanos. In the second season, the latter tortures the Red Skull before returning him to Earth to be placed in the Avengers' custody. After surviving the Winter Soldier's kidnapping attempt, the Red Skull is restored to his former glory and escapes to Monster Island with the help of Dormammu's Mindless Ones. He creates an impenetrable magic-based force field around the island to protect himself from Thanos, but is expelled by Ant-Man and Fin Fang Foom. The Red Skull also makes sporadic appearances in the fourth and fifth seasons.
 A Battleworld pirate version of the Red Skull called the Dread Skull appears in the fourth season episode "The Vibranium Coast".
 The Johann Schmidt incarnation of the Red Skull appears in Phineas and Ferb: Mission Marvel, voiced again by Liam O'Brien.
 The Johann Schmidt incarnation of the Red Skull appears in the Hulk and the Agents of S.M.A.S.H. episode "Days of Future Smash, Part 4: The Hydra Years", voiced again by Liam O'Brien. While traveling through time to stop the Leader, the Hulk encounters Captain America during World War II before both heroes learn of the Leader's plot to turn the Red Skull into the Green Skull via the Hulk's gamma energy. With the Hulk weakened, the Green Skull overpowers and forces Captain America to surrender. In the resulting alternate timeline, the Leader controls HYDRA using a wheel-like device powered by the Green Skull. With the help of the Agents of S.M.A.S.H. and an older Captain America, the Hulk is freed and regains his stolen gamma energy from the Green Skull, turning the latter back into the Red Skull while the Leader escapes, changing the timeline back to normal.
 An alternate timeline dinosaur version of the Red Skull called the Red Skullasaurus appears in "Days of Future Smash, Part 5: The Tomorrow Smashers". The Leader summons it, among other paradoxical creatures, to help him fight the Agents of S.M.A.S.H. However, he is defeated and the creatures are returned to their respective timelines.
 The Johann Schmidt incarnation of the Red Skull appears in Lego Marvel Super Heroes: Maximum Overload, voiced by Chi McBride.
 The Johann Schmidt incarnation of the Red Skull appears Marvel Disk Wars: The Avengers, voiced by Motomu Kiyokawa in Japanese and Liam O'Brien in English.
 The Johann Schmidt incarnation of the Red Skull appears in Marvel Future Avengers, voiced again by Motomu Kiyokawa in Japanese and Liam O'Brien in English.

Film

 An original incarnation of the Red Skull appears Captain America (1990), portrayed by Scott Paulin. This version is an Italian officer, later Mafioso, named Tadzio de Santis, a prodigy whose family was killed by Axis soldiers who subjected him to the super-soldier formula, leaving him deformed. With his memory erased to make him loyal to the Axis Powers, the Red Skull launches a missile at Washington D.C., but Captain America attacks the Red Skull's base. The latter battles the former aboard a flying missile before the Red Skull cuts off his hand to avoid death. After Captain America is trapped in ice for decades, the Red Skull forms a criminal organization with his daughter Valentina de Santis and attempts to brainwash the President, only to be stopped by a recording of his family's death. Momentarily distracted, he is slammed off a cliff by Captain America's shield.
 The Johann Schmidt incarnation of the Red Skull appears in Heroes United: Iron Man and Captain America, voiced again by Liam O'Brien.

Marvel Cinematic Universe

The Johann Schmidt incarnation of the Red Skull appears in media set in the Marvel Cinematic Universe (MCU):
 He is introduced in the live-action film Captain America: The First Avenger, portrayed by Hugo Weaving. This version is the head of HYDRA, which originally served as the Nazis' deep-science division. Schmidt ordered Dr. Abraham Erskine to use an experimental formula on him, which physically enhanced him, but permanently disfigured him. As a result, Adolf Hitler nicknamed Schmidt the "Red Skull" and exiled him. While leading an incursion into Norway in 1942, Schmidt recovers the Tesseract and has his chief scientist Arnim Zola develop advanced weapons powered by the object. Disillusioned with the Nazis, Schmidt breaks away from their regime and establishes HYDRA as its own force against the Allies and Axis alike with aspirations of world dominion. However, Steve Rogers leads the Allies' fight against HYDRA, forcing the group to retreat to their final base in the Alps. In 1945, Schmidt launches his plan to destroy populated cities across the United States, only to be defeated by Rogers and seemingly disintegrated by the Tesseract while attempting to use it.
 Schmidt returns in the live-action film Avengers: Infinity War, portrayed by Ross Marquand. Following the events of The First Avenger, Schmidt was transported to the planet Vormir and forced to serve as a "stonekeeper", guiding those who seek the Soul Stone as punishment for his use of the Tesseract. As the Soul Stone requires the sacrifice of a loved one, of which he had none, he was unable to claim it for himself. In 2018, Thanos and Gamora arrive on Vormir to claim the Soul Stone, which Schmidt directs them to. Directors Joe and Anthony Russo stated that, after Thanos claimed the Soul Stone, Schmidt was freed from his curse and permitted to leave Vormir and pursue his own desires. 
 A past version of Schmidt appears in the live-action film Avengers: Endgame, portrayed again by Marquand. He guides a time-traveling Natasha Romanoff and Clint Barton to the Soul Stone.
 An alternate timeline version of Schmidt appears in the Disney+ animated series What If...? episode "What If... Captain Carter Were the First Avenger?", voiced by Ross Marquand. Similarly to the events of The First Avenger, he attempts to achieve world domination via the Tesseract, but faces opposition from Captain Carter instead. Schmidt's plans eventually culminate in him using the Tesseract to open a portal and summon an interdimensional creature, only for it to kill him.

Video games
 The Johann Schmidt incarnation of the Red Skull appears as the penultimate boss of Captain America and The Avengers.
 The Johann Schmidt incarnation of the Red Skull appears in the PlayStation 3 and Xbox 360 versions of Marvel Super Hero Squad: The Infinity Gauntlet, voiced again by Mark Hamill.
 The Johann Schmidt incarnation of the Red Skull, based on the MCU incarnation, appears in Captain America: Super Soldier, voiced by Keith Ferguson.
 The Johann Schmidt incarnation of the Red Skull appears as a non-playable character in Marvel Super Hero Squad: Comic Combat, voiced again by Mark Hamill.
 The Johann Schmidt incarnation of the Red Skull and his Dell Rusk alias appears in Marvel: Avengers Alliance. This version commands the Dark Avengers.
 The Johann Schmidt incarnation of the Red Skull appears in Lego Marvel Super Heroes, voiced again by Steve Blum.
 The Johann Schmidt incarnation of the Red Skull appears as playable character in Lego Marvel's Avengers, voiced again by Liam O'Brien. This version sports the "Iron Skull" armor from Avengers Assemble.
 The Johann Schmidt incarnation of the Red Skull appears in Lego Marvel Super Heroes 2.
 The Johann Schmidt incarnation of the Red Skull appears as a boss in Marvel Ultimate Alliance 3: The Black Order, voiced again by Liam O'Brien.
 The Johann Schmidt incarnation of the Red Skull appears in Marvel Future Revolution, voiced again by Liam O'Brien.

Literature
 The Albert Malik incarnation of the Red Skull appears in the prologue of the novels Spider-Man: The Revenge of the Sinister Six.
 The Albert Malik incarnation of the Red Skull appears in Spider-Man: The Secret of the Sinister Six.
 The Johann Schmidt incarnation of the Red Skull appears in the Chaos Engine novel trilogy. After acquiring the titular engine, a flawed version of the Cosmic Cube, he uses it to create a reality where the Nazis won World War II and established a galactic empire. However, he is opposed by a group of X-Men who were outside of reality when he made his changes and fight to restore the original reality with the help of a young lieutenant who joined the Red Skull, but became disillusioned with him. Following this, he is left drifting outside of reality, with residual energy he had absorbed from other Cosmic Cubes keeping him alive.

Miscellaneous
 The Johann Schmidt incarnation of the Red Skull appears in Marvel Universe Live!. This version sports the "Iron Skull" armor from Avengers Assemble.
 The Johann Schmidt incarnation of the Red Skull appears in Disneyland Paris' "Marvel Season of Super Heroes".

Collected editions

References

External links
 Red Skull (disambiguation) at Marvel.com
 Red Skull (Johann Shmidt) at Marvel.com
 Red Skull (Albert Malik) at Marvel.com
 

Action film villains
Villains in animated television series
Captain America characters
Characters created by France Herron
Characters created by Jack Kirby
Characters created by Joe Simon
Clone characters in comics
Comics characters introduced in 1941
Fictional characters with disfigurements
Fictional cryonically preserved characters in comics
Fictional dictators
Fictional German people
Fictional mass murderers
Fictional military strategists
Fictional Nazi fugitives
Fictional torturers
Golden Age supervillains
Hydra (comics) agents
Male characters in film
Male film villains
Marvel Comics film characters
Marvel Comics male supervillains
Marvel Comics martial artists
Marvel Comics mutates
Marvel Comics Nazis
Marvel Comics orphans
Timely Comics characters